Edwardsville is a city in Wyandotte County, Kansas, United States, and part of the Kansas City Metropolitan Area.  As of the 2020 census, the population of the city was 4,717.

History
Edwardsville was surveyed in 1869 on land formerly belonging to Half Moon, an Indian chief of the Delawares. It was named for John H. Edwards, a general passenger agent for the Union Pacific Railroad, who later served as a justice of the peace and state senator from Ellis County, Kansas.

Geography
Edwardsville is located at  (39.063428, -94.814347).

Demographics

Edwardsville is part of the Kansas City Metropolitan Area and is part of a unified local government, which also contains Kansas City, Kansas, a portion of Bonner Springs, and roughly one quarter of Lake Quivira. .

2010 census
As of the census of 2010, there were 4,340 people, 1,632 households, and 1,107 families residing in the city. The racial makeup of the city was 86.6% White, 6.0% African American, 0.8% Native American, 0.8% Asian, 0.1% Pacific Islander, 2.8% from other races, and 2.9% from two or more races. Hispanic or Latino of any race were 7.3% of the population.

There were 1,632 households, of which 35.9% had children under the age of 18 living with them, 49.4% were married couples living together, 12.9% had a female householder with no husband present, 5.5% had a male householder with no wife present, and 32.2% were non-families. 26.2% of all households were made up of individuals, and 9.4% had someone living alone who was 65 years of age or older. The average household size was 2.55 and the average family size was 3.06.

The median age in the city was 36.9 years. 25.6% of residents were under the age of 18; 7.3% were between the ages of 18 and 24; 27.6% were from 25 to 44; 26.7% were from 45 to 64; and 12.7% were 65 years of age or older. The gender makeup of the city was 48.6% male and 51.4% female.

2000 census
As of the census of 2000, there were 4,146 people, 1,568 households, and 1,091 families residing in the city. The racial makeup of the city was 90.33% White, 4.94% African American, 0.36% Native American, 0.24% Asian, 1.76% from other races, and 2.36% from two or more races. Hispanic or Latino of any race were 4.78% of the population.

There were 1,568 households, out of which 32.8% had children under the age of 18 living with them, 53.6% were married couples living together, 11.8% had a female householder with no husband present, and 30.4% were non-families. 26.3% of all households were made up of individuals, and 10.0% had someone living alone who was 65 years of age or older. The average household size was 2.52 and the average family size was 3.03.

In the city, the population was spread out, with 26.0% under the age of 18, 8.1% from 18 to 24, 30.0% from 25 to 44, 21.5% from 45 to 64, and 14.4% who were 65 years of age or older. The median age was 36 years. For every 100 females, there were 91.1 males. For every 100 females age 18 and over, there were 84.6 males.

The median income for a household in the city was $42,875, and the median income for a family was $48,225. Males had a median income of $37,806 versus $23,750 for females. The per capita income for the city was $18,887. About 7.3% of families and 7.6% of the population were below the poverty line, including 11.5% of those under age 18 and 6.5% of those age 65 or over.

Government
The city of Edwardsville maintains a full scope of emergency services.  It has a police department with officers on-duty 24 hours a day, 365 days a year.  The fire department serves the citizens and visitors of the cities of Edwardsville, Bonner Springs, and western Kansas City.  It is staffed by 17 full-time, 7 part-time personnel, and 5 volunteers.  The department has fire code inspectors, and provides advance life support through its two ambulances.

Education
The community is served by Bonner Springs–Edwardsville USD 204 public school district.

Notable people
 Junius George Groves (1859-1925), businessman and farmer, lived in Edwardsville.

See also
 List of Wyandotte County parks and parkways

References

External links

 City of Edwardsville
 Edwardsville - Directory of Public Officials
 Edwardsville city map, KDOT

Cities in Kansas
Cities in Wyandotte County, Kansas